Idland is a surname. Notable people with the surname include:

Åse Idland (born 1973), Norwegian biathlete
Kasper Idland (1918–1968), Norwegian resistance member
Sverre Idland, Norwegian sport shooter

Norwegian-language surnames